"Forever Young" is a song by British singer-songwriter Rod Stewart, first released on his 1988 album Out of Order. The song was a Top 20 hit on the Billboard Hot 100, peaking at #12, and #9 on the Canadian RPM Magazine charts.

Background
Stewart wrote the song with two of his band members: guitarist Jim Cregan and keyboardist Kevin Savigar.  Stewart told Mojo magazine in 1995 that he considered "Forever Young" to be one of his favourite songs and the reason for writing it was, "I love 'Forever Young', because that was a real heartfelt song about my kids.  I suddenly realized I'd missed a good five years of Sean and Kimberly's life because I was so busy touring all the time.  With these kids now I don't make that mistake -- I take them on tour with me, so I can watch them grow up.  So that's another favourite.  Unfortunately, it wasn't a big hit in England, but it's like a national anthem here [America]."

The structure of the lyrics in this song was similar enough to a Bob Dylan song of the same title that, after its completion, the song was then sent to Dylan, asking whether he had a problem with it. The two men agreed to participate in the ownership of the song and share Stewart's royalties.

In January 1989, immediately following the broadcast of Super Bowl XXIII, NBC Sports used "Forever Young" as the soundtrack for a year-in-review montage showcasing highlights from the 1988 Summer Olympics, the 1988 World Series, the 1989 Fiesta Bowl, and Super Bowl XXIII. All four events had been broadcast by NBC.

Stewart recorded a more mellow version of the song for his 1996 compilation album If We Fall in Love Tonight, and a version featuring just Stewart's voice with piano accompaniment can be found on the 2009 compilation album The Rod Stewart Sessions 1971-1998. A live version was recorded during his MTV Unplugged session in 1993. Though not included on the original release of the live album Unplugged...and Seated, this version was later released as a bonus track on the Collector's Edition of the album released by Rhino Records in 2009. Another live version of the song from his 2013 performance at The Troubadour, West Hollywood was included on the deluxe edition of the album Time.

Music video
The video for this song features Stewart singing to a child, played by Alex Zuckerman, while scenes of rural America pass by.  It was filmed on Potrero Road in Hidden Valley, Ventura County, California.

Chart history

Weekly charts

Year-end charts

Other versions
An acoustic version was performed by Matthew Morrison in the Glee third-season finale episode "Goodbye".

References

Rod Stewart songs
1988 singles
Songs written by Bob Dylan
Songs written by Rod Stewart
Songs involved in plagiarism controversies
Songs written by Jim Cregan
Songs written by Kevin Savigar
1988 songs
Warner Records singles